The , built in 1957, is a  TV tower with an observation deck at a height of 90.38 metres. Located on the ground of Odori Park, in the northern city of Sapporo, Hokkaido, Japan, the tower is open to tourists. Tourists can view Sapporo and Odori Park.

History

The TV Tower was built in 1957 by Tachū Naitō, a Japanese architect who is famous for planning the Tokyo Tower, with the total construction costs of 170 million yen. Since the transmission facility was established on the Mount Teine, The Sapporo TV Tower has worked as a repeater of AIR-G' and FM North Wave, a radio station based in Sapporo.

In 1961, digital clocks were installed at the height of 65 metres from the ground, which were donated by Matsushita Electric Industrial Co., a Japanese electronics manufacturer. This installation was suggested by the founder of the company Konosuke Matsushita, who thought that these digital clocks would draw a great attention to the Tower. These digital clocks, installed at four sides of the Tower, have been repaired two times: in 1998 and 2006. The interior and exterior of the Sapporo TV Tower were renovated in 2002, and the color of walls at the second and third floors were then changed from pale green to dark green. In the second repair of the digital clocks in 2006, the light-emitting diode was adopted, and the advertisement right below the clocks was changed from the "National" to "Panasonic".

The Sapporo TV Tower commemorated its 50th anniversary in 2007, and some events and discount campaign were held. Recently, a plan of reconstructing a new TV tower of 650 metres high has come up. In the plan, the area of the supposed Tower would be 7800 m², and the height of the observation deck is supposed to be at 500 metres. The height of the new Tower will exceed Tokyo Skytree (634 meters) if it is realized. The new Tower building also plans to house hotel rooms, offices, and sports facilities in addition to functioning as a TV tower.

Outline

The ground floor of the Sapporo TV Tower houses an information center and stores. The multipurpose hall and administration office of the Tower are placed on the second floor, and a souvenir shop and restaurant are located on the third floor. The basement connects to the Aurora Town, an underground shopping arcade, and a number of restaurants called the "Tele-chika Gourmet Court" are located.

The official mascot of the Tower is "Tawakkie", and the unofficial character "Terebi-Tōsan" (Television Daddy) is also known.

The lift to the observation deck at 90 metres high is located on the third floor, where visitors are required to buy tickets to continue to the observation deck. From the observation deck, the entire view of the Odori Park, Mount Ōkura, and Maruyama are seen. Having the height of 147.2 metres, the Sapporo TV Tower used to be the most prominent figure in Sapporo, but recently many high-rise buildings have been constructed around the Odori Park, making the Tower less prominent.

Appearances in pop culture
 Food Wars!: Shokugeki no Soma
 Godzilla vs. King Ghidorah
 Godzilla vs. SpaceGodzilla
 Gamera 2: Attack of Legion
 Higehiro
 Monster X Strikes Back: Attack the G8 Summit
 Yakuza 5
 Persona 5: Scramble
 Wave, Listen to Me!
 Marmalade Boy

References

External links 

 Official Site (English)
 

Buildings and structures in Chūō-ku, Sapporo
Communication towers in Japan
Towers completed in 1957
Tourist attractions in Sapporo
Observation towers in Japan
1957 establishments in Japan